Mount Mulligan is a former mining town and now a rural locality in the Shire of Mareeba, Queensland, Australia. In the  Mount Mulligan had a population of 4 people.

It is the site of the Mount Mulligan mine disaster, Queensland's worst mining disaster.

Geography
Although still officially gazetted, Mount Mulligan is now a ghost town, with a single cemetery, a single occupied residence, a single chimney stack, and the overgrown remains of the once busy mining operations and electricity generator.

Nearby towns are Julatten, Dimbulah, Mount Carbine and Mount Molloy.

History
The conglomerate and sandstone mountain range is known to local Djungan people as Ngarrabullgan. The Djungan people began living on the mountain about 40,000 years ago but ceased to camp on the range about 600 years ago. The range was named Mount Mulligan after prospector James Venture Mulligan by his colleagues in their 1874 exploration expedition searching the Hodgkinson River for gold. The name Mount Mulligan was later given to the town that grew in the shadows of the range's escarpment.

The town's coal was mined from shafts dug into a Permian layer within the cliff face or escarpment of a large  x  free-standing conglomerate and sandstone massif (rising up to 400 metres above the township). It was a coal mining town from 1910 until 19 September 1921 when an underground explosion killed 75 miners (all the miners in the town). The mine closed, but reopened in 1923 and continued in production until 1957 when a hydro-electric scheme eliminated the need for the coal.

Mount Mulligan Post Office opened by July 1914 (a receiving office had been open from 1907) and closed in 1959. A Mount Mulligan Rail Post Office was open between 1916 and 1920.

The Chillagoe railway connected Mount Mulligan with Dimbulah. It opened on 7 April 1915 and was officially closed in January 1958.

At the 2006 census, Mount Mulligan and the surrounding area had a population of 55.

In the  the locality of Mount Mulligan had a population of 4 people.

Education
There are no schools in Mount Mulligan. The nearest primary and secondary school (P-10) school is Dimbulah State School in Dimbulah to the south, but it would be too distant from many parts of Mount Mulligan. There is no secondary school to Year 12 nearby. Distance education and boarding school are options.

See also

 Ngarrabullgan

References

External links

Shire of Mareeba
Mining towns in Queensland
Towns in Queensland
Ghost towns in Queensland
Geography of Far North Queensland
Populated places established in 1910
1910 establishments in Australia
Localities in Queensland